Akobo may refer to:

 Akobo (woreda), Ethiopia
 Akobo River, on the border between South Sudan and Ethiopia
 Akobo, South Sudan
 Akobo County, South Sudan
 Akobo State, South Sudan
 Akobo Airport, located in Akobo, South Sudan